Elena Irureta Azanza (born 30 July 1955) is a Spanish actress. She has performed in many Basque-language and Spanish-language television productions.

Biography 
Elena Irureta Azanza was born in Zumaia (Gipuzkoa) on 30 July 1955. She became a professional stage actress after graduating from the Escuela de Arte Dramático de Antzerti in San Sebastián.

Irureta appeared in films such as Fuego eterno, La monja alférez, El mar es azul, The Dead Mother, Hola, ¿estás sola? or La ardilla roja.

She became known in the Basque television, performing in series such as Bi eta bat, Beni eta Marini, Jaun eta Jabe.

After performing supporting roles in Spain-wide fiction shows (Al salir de clase, Periodistas or Hermanas), she had her breakout role in TV with her 11-season-long performance as Laura Hurtado in the television series El comisario.

Filmography 

Television

Awards and nominations

References 

1955 births
20th-century Spanish actresses
21st-century Spanish actresses
Spanish stage actresses
Spanish television actresses
Spanish film actresses
Actresses from the Basque Country (autonomous community)
Living people
Basque-language actors
People from Urola Kosta